Suez University is an Egyptian public university established by the presidential decree no 193 in 2012 to transfer Suez Canal University branch in Suez to an independent university. Suez University is the first university established by a presidential decree after the January 25 revolution in Egypt.

Centers
 Center of Excellence for Energy and Water
 Public Service Center for Human Development and Performance Development
 Center for Scientific Consultation, Training and Environmental monitoring
 Center for Community Service and Environmental Development
 Public Service Center for Engineering and Environment
 Public Service Center for Technological Consultation, Research and Training
 Public Service Center for Trade and Economic Consultation

References

External links 
 Suez Suez Governorate

Universities in Egypt
Public universities
Educational institutions established in 2012
2012 establishments in Egypt
Suez